Mamas Ramachandran, better known as Mamas, is an Indian film director, screenwriter, and caricaturist. He made his directorial debut in 2010 with Paappi Appacha.

Career life 
Mamas started his career by assisting veteran directors I V Sasi and duo Rafi Mecartin. Mamas's directorial debut was Paappi Appacha starring Dileep and Kavya Madhavan. His second directorial venture- Cinema Company starred mainly newcomers selected through audition across Kerala. Mannar Mathai Speaking 2, his third movie was a sequel to Mannar Mathai Speaking directed by duo Siddique-Lal 25 years ago.

Personal life 

He is settled with his 3-year-old son Gagan and wife, Sumitha who is helming MBO an Advertising and branding company in Cochin.

Filmography

References

External links
 

Film directors from Kerala
Living people
1981 births
Malayalam film directors
People from Idukki district